The following is a list of notable deaths in September 1998.

Entries for each day are listed alphabetically by surname. A typical entry lists information in the following sequence:
 Name, age, country of citizenship at birth, subsequent country of citizenship (if applicable), reason for notability, cause of death (if known), and reference.

September 1998

1
Francisco Coching, 78, Filipino comic books illustrator and writer.
Albert W. Johnson, 92, American politician.
Harry Knudsen, 79, Danish rower and Olympic medalist.
Józef Krupiński, 67, Polish poet.
Cary Middlecoff, 77, American golfer, heart disease.
Nick Murphy, 31, English footballer, car crash.
Vere Harmsworth, 3rd Viscount Rothermere, 73, British newspaper magnate.
Osman Fahir Seden, 74, Turkish film director, screenwriter and film producer.
Ernest Edward Williams, 84, American herpetologist.
Petar Šegedin, 89, Croatian writer.

2
Jackie Blanchflower, 65, Northern Irish footballer, cancer.
Roy Bradford, 77, Northern Irish politician.
Mary Lou Clements-Mann, 51, American AIDS researcher, plane crash.
Allen Drury, 80, American novelist and Pullizer Prize winner, cardiac arrest, heart attack.
Charles A. Ferguson, 77, American linguist.
Willie Kizart, 66, American electric blues guitarist.
Jonathan Mann, 51, American physician and former head of the WHO's AIDS program, plane crash.
Danièle Parola, 93, French film actress.
Tommy J. Smith, 81, Australian racehorse trainer.

3
Vince Alascia, 84, American comic book artist (Captain America).
Samuel Findlay Clark, 89, Canadian Army general.
Ellis R. Kerley, 74, American forensic anthropologist.
Anup Kumar, 68, Indian actor.
Friedrich Körner, 77, World War II Luftwaffe Flying ace.
Albert Nemethy, 78, Hungarian-American artist.

4
Hans Brenner, 59, Austrian actor.
Jimmy Constantine, 78, English football player.
Hernando Durán Dussán, Colombian lawyer and politician, respiratory infection.
Robert Higgins, 73, American weightlifter.
Ernst Jaakson, 93, Estonian diplomat.
Elizabeth Kata, 85, Australian writer under the pseudonym "Elizabeth Kata".
Charles Kemball, 75, Scottish chemist.
Tania Long, 85, American journalist and war correspondent during World War II.
Masato Nakae, 80, Japanese American US Army soldier and Medal of Honor recipient.
Inge Scholl, 81, German activist and resistance member during World War II, cancer.
Lal Waterson, 55, English folksinger and songwriter, cancer.

5
Fernando Balzaretti, 52, Mexican actor, cardiovascular disease.
Leon Dombrowski, 60, American gridiron football player.
Willem Drees, 75, Dutch politician and son of politician Willem Drees.
Michael Fleischer, 90, American chemist and mineralogist.
Sonny Knight, 64, American singer, songwriter and author, complications following a stroke.
Margaret Lefranc, 91, American visual artist.
Félix Morisseau-Leroy, 86, Haitian writer.
Minoru Niizuma, 67, Japanese abstract sculptor, stroke.
Verner Panton, 72, Danish interior designer.
Leo Penn, 77, American actor and director, lung cancer.
Billy Soose, 83, American boxer.

6
Ernst-Hugo Järegård, 69, Swedish cult actor, multiple myeloma.
Akira Kurosawa, 88, Japanese film director and screenwriter (Seven Samurai, Rashomon, Throne of Blood), stroke.
Hava Lazarus-Yafeh, 68, German-Israeli orientalist and academic.
Ric Segreto, 45, American-Filipino singer-songwriter and actor, motorcycle accident.
Elaine Shepard, 85, American actress.
Denise Spencer, 68, Australian freestyle swimmer and Olympian.

7
Håvard Alstadheim, 62, Norwegian economist and politician.
Mario Bardi, 77, Italian Realist painter, stroke.
André Bonin, 89, French fencer and Olympic champion.
Prof. K.M. Chandy, 77, Indian freedom fighter and politician.
Valeri Frid, 76, Soviet screenwriter.
John Osler Chattock Hayes, 85, British Royal Navy officer.

8
Walter Adams, 76, American economist and college professor, pancreatic cancer.
Leonid Kinskey, 95, Russian-born actor, complications of a stroke.
Arsh Muneer, 84, Pakistani actress and singer.
Marco Rizo, 77, Cuban-American pianist, composer, and arranger, heart attack.
Bill Shankland, 91, Australian sportsman, heart failure.
Ewald Tilker, 86, German canoeist and Olympic medalist.
Tryfon Tzanetis, 80, Greek football player and coach.

9
Lucio Battisti, 55, Italian singer-songwriter and composer, cancer.
Bill Cratty, 47, American modern dancer and choreographer, liver cancer.
Eleanor Garatti, 89, American swimmer and Olympic gold medalist.
Mariano Martín, 78, Spanish footballer.
Catherine Turney, 91, American writer and screenwriter.
Jerry Zimmerman, 63, American baseball player and coach.

10
Carl Forgione, 54, British actor.
Freddie Green, 82, English professional footballer.
Adolfe de Hoernle, 96, German-American philanthropist.
Noshirvan Nagarwala, 88, Indian cricket umpire.
Frederick Rosier, 82, British Royal Air Force commander.
Kedar Man Vyathit, 84, Nepali poet.

11
Paku Alam VIII, 88, Indonesian royal and Governor of Yogyakarta.
Sofía Bassi, 85, Mexican painter and writer, heart failure.
Dane Clark, 86, American actor.
Stephie D'Souza, 61, Indian athlete and Olympian.
Carlos Guimard, 85, Argentine chess Grandmaster.
Rolando Morán, 68, Guatemalan revolutionary leader, heart attack.
P. S. Veerappa, 87, Indian actor and film producer.

12
George E. Danielson, 83, American politician and judge, heart failure.
Hans Grimm, 93, German film director and screenwriter.
Azem Hajdari, 35, Albanian student leader, murdered.
Awang Hassan, 87, Malaysian politician.
John Holliman, 49, American broadcast journalist, traffic accident.
Henry Spira, 71, Belgian-American animal rights activist, esophageal cancer.

13
Talimeren Ao, 80, Indian footballer and physician.
Denys Buckley, 92, English barrister and judge.
Necdet Calp, 76, Turkish civil servant and politician, heart attack.
Aloys Grillmeier, 88, German Jesuit priest and theologian.
Frans Hogenbirk, 80, Dutch football player.
Owen Horwood, 81, South African economist and politician, heart attack.
Antonio Núñez Jiménez, 75, Cuban revolutionary and academic.
Harry Lumley, 71, Canadian ice hockey goaltender in the National Hockey League.
Phil Ridings, 80, Australian cricket player.
George Wallace, 79, American politician and populist, Parkinson's disease.

14
Johnny Adams, 66, American blues, jazz and gospel singer, prostate cancer.
Hahn William Capps, 95, American entomologist.
Sue Geh, 39, Australian women's basketball player, heart failure.
Fred Korth, 89, United States Secretary of the Navy.
George Scott, 69, English snooker player.
Yang Shangkun, 91, President of the People's Republic of China.

15
Fred Alderman, 93, American sprint runner and Olympic champion.
Barrett Deems, 84, American swing drummer, pneumonia.
Charles George Drake, 78, Canadian neurosurgeon.
René Ferrier, 61, French football midfielder.
Viljo Heino, 84, Finnish long-distance runner and Olympian.
Reynold B. Johnson, 92, American inventor and computer pioneer, melanoma.
Carl Larpenter, 62, American gridiron football player.
Caroline Mikkelsen, 91, Danish-Norwegian explorer.
Don Perkins, 80, American football player.
Louis Rasminsky, 90, Canadian banker.
Eva Gabriele Reichmann, 101, German historian and sociologist.

16
Egidio Ariosto, 87, Italian politician.
Jane Marsh Beveridge, 82, Canadian artist.
John Eakins, 75, Canadian politician.
Mazhar Khan, Indian actor and producer, renal failure.
Bjørn Stenersen, 28, Norwegian racing cyclist and Olympian.
John Systad, 86, Norwegian long-distance runner and Olympian.
Andrzej Trzaskowski, 65, Polish jazz composer and musicologist.
Pak Tu-jin, 82, Korean poet.
Harold Vokes, 90, American malacologist and paleontologist.
John Woyat, 65, Canadian football player.

17
William Albright, 53, American composer, pianist and organist.
Ted Binion, 54, American gambling executive.
Geoffrey Dutton, 76, Australian author and historian.
Win Elliot, 83, American television and radio sportscaster and game show host.
April FitzLyon, 78, English translator, biographer, and historian.
Gerold Frank, 91, American author and ghostwriter.
Red Hoff, 107, American left-handed pitcher in Major League Baseball, fall.
Gustav Nezval, 90, Czech stage and film actor.
Ralph Pappier, 84, Argentine production designer and film director.
Celia Rooke, 96, English printmaker and book illustrator.

18
Francelia Butler, 85, American scholar and children's author.
Charlie Foxx, 64, American musician.
Kurt Hager, 86, East German politician.
Erik Holmberg, 76, Norwegian football player.
Sam Locke, 81, American writer and director.
Harun Nasution, 79, Indonesian scholar.
Vadim Rogovin, 61, Russian Trotskyist historian and sociologist.

19
Susan Barrantes, 61, British film producer and mother of Sarah, Duchess of York, traffic accident.
Patricia Hayes, 88, English actress (The NeverEnding Story, Willow, A Fish Called Wanda).
Ran Laurie, 83, British physician, Olympic gold medalist and father of Hugh Laurie, Parkinson's disease.
John Norby, 88, American gridiron football player.

20
Audrey Alexandra Brown, 93, Canadian poet.
Muriel Humphrey Brown, 86, American politician and wife of Vice President Hubert Humphrey.
Robert Malachy Burke, 91, Christian socialist and philanthropist.
Lila Katzen, 72, American abstract sculptor, liver cancer.
Alan Prescott, 71, English rugby league footballer.
Raoul Schránil, 88, Czech film actor.

21
Margaret Allan, 89, Scottish motor racing driver.
Oz Bach, 59, American folk musician, cancer.
Clara Calamai, 89, Italian actress, stroke.
Florence Griffith Joyner, 38, American track and field athlete, and Olympic champion, epileptic seizure, epilepsy.
Vladimir Pokhilko, 44, Soviet-Russian entrepreneur, suicide.
Arto Tiainen, 68, Finnish cross-country skier and politician.

22
Ymer Dishnica, 86, Albanian politician and physician.
Michel Dubé, 39, Canadian outlaw biker and gangster, suicide.
Otakhon Latifi, 62, Tajikistan journalist and politician, murdered.
Henry Mayer, 72, German composer.
Doug Smith, 73, Scottish rugby union player.

23
Søren Andersen, 72, Danish football player.
Ray Bowden, 89, English footballer.
Mary Frann, 55, American actress (Newhart, Days of Our Lives, Knots Landing), heart attack.
Brian Masters, 65, British Anglican prelate, Bishop of Fulham and Edmonton.
Héctor Vilches, 72, Uruguayan football player.
Robert Wells, 75, American songwriter and television producer.

24
Genrich Altshuller, 71, Soviet engineer, inventor, and writer, Parkinson's disease.
Rosendo Balinas Jr., 57, Filipino chess grandmaster.
Frank Curran, 81, English footballer.
Jeff Moss, 56, American  composer, playwright and television writer, colon cancer.
Ernie Pannell, 81, American gridiron football player.

25
Billy Giles, 41, Northern Irish UVF volunteer , suicide by hanging.
Shaukat Hayat Khan, 83, Pakistani politician, activist and military officer.
Johnny McGrory, 83, Scottish boxer.
Wim Schepers, 55, Dutch road cyclist, cardiac arrest.
Cas Walker, 96, American politician and radio and TV personality.
Caspar Wrede, 69, Finnish theatre and film director.

26
Giovanni Barbini, 97, Italian naval officer during World War II.
Betty Carter, 68, American jazz singer, pancreatic cancer.
Jack Haskell, 79, American singer and announcer.
Jerome D. Mack, 77, American banker, fundraiser and philanthropist, cancer.
Harald Vock, 73, German television producer and director.

27
Alex Joseph, 62, American outspoken polygamist and founder of the Confederate Nations of Israel, a Mormon fundamentalist sect, liver cancer.
Karlheinz Kaske, 70, German manager and CEO of the Siemens AG from 1981 to 1992.
Narita Bryan, 7, Japanese racehorse, gastric rupture.
Shawn Phelan, 23, American actor (Toy Soldiers), brain injury.
Doak Walker, 71, American football player (Detroit Lions) and member of the Pro Football Hall of Fame, skiing accident.

28
Eric Malling, 52, Canadian television journalist, brain hemorrhage after fall.
Joan Maude, 90, English actress.
Marcel Pourbaix, 94, Belgian chemist.
Louis L. Redding, 96, American lawyer and civil rights advocate.
Shiv Prasaad Singh, 70, Indian writer and academic.
George Tranter, 83, English football player.

29
Tom Bradley, 80, American politician and police officer, heart attack.
Valston Hancock, 91, Australian commander in the Royal Australian Air Force.
Gordon W. Richards, 68, British racehorse trainer.
Joachim Count of Schönburg-Glauchau, 69, German nobleman.

30
D. Bruce Berry, 74, American comic book artist (Captain America).
Laurie Brown, 61, English football player and manager.
Frank Forberger, 55, East German rower and Olympic champion, brain cancer.
Marius Goring, 86, English actor, cancer.
Nechama Hendel, 62, Israeli singer.
Émile Krieps, 78, Luxembourgish army officer and politician.
Bruno Munari, 90, Italian artist and designer.
Stephen Pearlman, 63, American actor (Die Hard with a Vengeance, Pi, Quiz Show), cancer.
Dan Quisenberry, 45, American baseball player, brain cancer.
Robert R. Squires, 45, American chemist.
Robert Lewis Taylor, 86, American author and Pullizer Prize winner.
Pavel Štěpán, 73, Czech pianist.

References 

1998-09
 09